Takagi Yoshin-ryū ("Takagi Heart of the Willow School") was a school of Japanese martial arts. It was founded by Ito Sukesada, based on techniques that he learned from an ascetic named So Unryu. He taught this system to a samurai named Takagi  Oriuemon Shingenobu, and Takagi's name was added to the school's. Tagaki was already a teacher of jutaijutsu, an unarmed grappling system similar to the Chinese art of taijiquan. He was recognised as  a shihan by Emperor Higashiyama in 1695.

The Takagi ryū was influenced by other arts, particularly Takenouchi-ryū and Kukishin-ryū. A match between the headmasters of the Tagaki and Kukishin styles in the 17th century led to further cross-training between the two schools.

References

Japanese martial arts
Jujutsu
Ko-ryū bujutsu